Ceyhan–Kırıkkale Oil Pipeline, also known as Yumurtalık (Ceyhan)–Kırıkkale Oil Pipeline is a crude oil pipeline between Ceyhan and Kırıkkale in Turkey. It is owned and operated by the state-owned company Botaş.

Background
The construction of the Ceyhan–Kırıkkale Oil Pipeline began in May 1983 and completed in February 1986. It was built by the Tekfen Construction and Installation. The -long pipeline crosses steep slopes of Taurus Mountains. The pipeline was commissioned in 1986 to make the 1986-built Kırıkkale Refinery operational.

Technical features
The pipeline transports crude oil from Botaş Ceyhan Oil Terminal to Tüpraş Kırıkkale Oil Refinery for refining purpose. Botaş Ceyhan Oil Terminal is located in Ceyhan, Adana Province in southern Turkey on the northern coast of Gulf of Alexandretta at northeastern Mediterranean Sea. Tüpraş Kırıkkale Oil Refinery is located in Kırıkkale Province, central Anatolia.

The Botaş Ceyhan Oil terminal is the end point of the Kirkuk–Ceyhan Oil Pipeline carrying crude oil from Iraq to Turkey. The Ceyhan Terminal has twelve oil storage tanks with each  capacity. At the arrival point of the pipeline, the refinery has one storage tank of  capacity. In 2016, a total of 4.9 million tonnes (35,4 million barrels) were transported. The source of the transported oil either Iraq by the Kirkuk–Ceyhan Pipeline or local or imported oil by sea.

Oil theft
From time to time, the pipeline becomes subject to oil theft. In 2006, thieves were caught in Çakaldere, Ceyhan village, Adana after they tapped oil from the pipeline into a tank truck. Thieves were caught in the act the same year after having loaded  oil to a tank truck from the pipeline in Yüreğir district of Adana. In Yılankale, Ceyhan village, thieves caused a fire at the pipeline in 2007 as they tried to bore a hole in the pipeline. Damage in the environment arose through oil spilled out. In Kılıçlı, Yüreğir village, thieves were arrested in 2009 while they were loading a 20-t tank truck by a hose from a hole in the pipeline. It was jointed to the main pipeline  under surface. In 2017, fire broke out again at the pipeline in Sarıçam, Yüreğir of Adana as the thieves tried to install a valve on the pipeline by welder.

References

Oil pipelines in Turkey
Energy infrastructure completed in 1986
1986 establishments in Turkey
Ceyhan
Kırıkkale